The Detroit Party Marching Band is a guerrilla band based in Detroit, Michigan. The band appears at events unexpectedly. They have played at events such as Mardi Gras in 2012, 2015, and 2017, Theatre Bizarre, Noel Night, Blowout!, the Nain Rouge parade, the Hamtramck Labor Day Parade, 2010 Detroit Free Press Marathon, and HONK! in Somerville, MA, as well as at many bars and parties throughout the Detroit area, both scheduled and unexpectedly. They have supported acts such as Band of Horses, Rebirth Brass Band, and What Cheer? Brigade. The band was founded by Rachel Harkai and John and Molly Notarianni, who felt inspired by the second-line bands they saw in New Orleans during Mardi Gras, and also after a trip to HONK! in late 2009. Its repertoire is a mix of Balkan and Balkan-inspired songs, and modern pop and R&B rearranged for brass, usually by the members themselves. They have also toured the Netherlands in Europe as part of the Cross Linx Music festival. They enjoy the admiration of their mothers, each other, and various drunks in and around Detroit!

References

External links
 Facebook Page
 YouTube Video
 YouTube Page

American marching bands
Musical groups from Detroit
2009 establishments in Michigan